Events in the year 2023 in Bahrain.

Incumbents

Events 
Ongoing – COVID-19 pandemic in Bahrain

Sports 

 19 September 2022 – 8 March 2023: 2022–23 Bahraini King's Cup
 2022–23 Bahraini FA Cup
 2022–23 Bahraini Premier League
 2022–23 Bahraini Second Division

References 

 

 
2020s in Bahrain
Years of the 21st century in Bahrain
Bahrain
Bahrain